The 1986 Miami Redskins football team was an American football team that represented Miami University in the Mid-American Conference (MAC) during the 1986 NCAA Division I-A football season. In its fourth season under head coach Tim Rose, the team compiled an 8–4 record (6–2 against MAC opponents), won the MAC championship, outscored all opponents by a combined total of 346 to 228, and lost to San Jose State (7–37) in the 1986 California Bowl.

The team's statistical leaders included Terry Morris with 2,365 passing yards, George Swarn with 1,112 rushing yards, and Andy Schillinger with 955 receiving yards.

Schedule

References

Miami
Miami RedHawks football seasons
Mid-American Conference football champion seasons
Miami Redskins football